Norbert Hirschhorn (born 1938) is an Austrian-born American public health physician. He was one of the inventors and developers of the life-saving method called oral rehydration therapy for adults and children suffering fluid loss from cholera and other infectious diarrheal illnesses. It is estimated that his work has saved around 50 million people suffering from dehydration.

In the past decade, he has conducted research on tobacco control, particularly examining once-secret, now publicly available tobacco industry documents. In retirement he devotes himself to writing and publishing poetry and literary book reviews.

Life and education 
Hirschhorn was born in Vienna, Austria, in 1938. He escaped the Nazi regime with his parents to London, where they spent the war until immigrating to the United States. He has three children from his first marriage: Elisabeth Hirschhorn Donahue, John Hirschhorn and Robert Hirschhorn. 
Hirschhorn grew up in New York, attending the Bronx High School of Science. He graduated from Columbia College, Columbia University in the City of New York in 1958 with a Bachelor of Arts, and later received his medical degree at Columbia University College of Physicians and Surgeons in 1962. He specialized in internal medicine with internship and residencies at Boston City Hospital, Harvard II and IV medical services (1962–64, 1967–8), and gained certification in 1970 from the American Board of Internal Medicine.

Hirschhorn joined the US Public Health Service in 1964, and was assigned to the Pakistan-Seato Cholera Research Laboratory, Dacca, East Pakistan (now the International Center for Diarrheal Disease Control, Bangladesh), where he conducted research on cholera and other diarrheal diseases and demonstrated the proof of concept of oral rehydration therapy.

Career 
After a post-doctoral fellowship from the National Institute of Arthritis and Metabolic Disease in electrophysiology at Harvard-affiliated Beth Israel Hospital in Boston (1968–1970), he was appointed Assistant Professor of Clinical Medicine, Johns Hopkins University School of Medicine at Baltimore City Hospital, and Lecturer, Department of International Health, Johns Hopkins University School of Hygiene and Public Health (1970–1973). In that time, he introduced oral rehydration therapy on the White River Apache Indian Reservation with a grant from the National Institute of Allergy and Infectious Diseases. It was demonstrated that children would voluntarily drink as much of the solution as needed to restore hydration; and that rehydration and early re-feeding would protect their nutrition. Wide application of the therapy in both clinical and non-clinical settings resulted. From that work, Hirschhorn established the clinical physiology of rehydration in children.

In 1978, Joel Lamstein and Hirschhorn founded John Snow, Incorporated (JSI), named after the father of epidemiology, John Snow, and initially launched as a small for-profit business focused on health care in the United States. In 1980, the organization began working internationally, with Hirschhorn serving as Vice-President of the International Division. From 1983 to 1991, JSI implemented the USAID-Ministry of Health sponsored National Control of Diarrheal Diseases Project in Egypt. Country-wide implementation of oral rehydration therapy and other control measures dramatically reduced child mortality.  From 1990 to 1993, with a United Nations Food and Agriculture Organization team, Hirschhorn conducted research on pesticide poisoning in Indonesian farmers.

From 1993 to 1995, Hirschhorn was Visiting Professor of Public Health at the University of Minnesota. He then left JSI to join the Minnesota Department of Health, directing the Division of Family Health (1995–1998). Between 1998 and 2005, he served as lecturer at the Yale University School of Medicine, Department of Epidemiology and Public Health; Visiting Senior Lecturer and Consultant, Faculty of Health Sciences, American University of Beirut, Lebanon; Visiting Lecturer, Princeton University, Woodrow Wilson School of Public and International Affairs; and Visiting Researcher at the National Public Health Institute in Finland. In those intervening years, he also served as a consultant to the World Health Organization Tobacco-Free Initiative, conducting research on tobacco industry documents. Several seminal papers were produced.

Since his retirement, Hirschhorn has published several essays on the life and illnesses of famous personalities of the 19th century, including Abraham Lincoln. He writes book reviews, and has published six collections of poetry. He lives in Minneapolis, Minnesota.

Achievements 
For his work in oral rehydration therapy, Hirschhorn was recognized by President William J. Clinton at a White House ceremony in 1993 as an "American Health Hero"; received the Charles A. Dana Foundation Award for Pioneering Achievement in Health in 1990; and the Pollin Prize for Pediatric Research in 2002.

Memberships and professional affiliations 
Professional Societies: American Public Health Association; National Council for International Health (Chair of 16th Annual Conference, 1989);  American Association for the Advancement of Science; Academy of Breastfeeding Medicine; Society for Research on Nicotine and Tobacco; Emily Dickinson International Society; British Haiku Society; Society of Medical Writers, UK; Poetry Society, UK.

Board Member of: Child Health Foundation, President; 1994–1996; National Council for International Health (1990–1996), Minnesota International Health Volunteers (1994–1997), Immunization Action Coalition (Minnesota), Minnesota Council for Preventive Medicine (1993–2000).

Bibliography

References 

American public health doctors
Jewish physicians
Austrian emigrants to the United States
1938 births
Living people
Columbia University Vagelos College of Physicians and Surgeons alumni
Vermont College of Fine Arts alumni
Columbia College (New York) alumni